United States Capitol shooting may refer to:

1954 United States Capitol shooting
1998 United States Capitol shooting
Shooting of Miriam Carey (2013)
2017 Congressional baseball shooting
Shooting of Ashli Babbitt (2021)